Imogene Peak, at  above sea level is a peak in the Sawtooth Range of Idaho. The peak is located in the Sawtooth Wilderness of Sawtooth National Recreation Area in Custer County. Farley Lake is located south of the peak, and Imogene Lake is west of the peak.

References 

Mountains of Custer County, Idaho
Mountains of Idaho
Sawtooth Wilderness